is a Japanese professional wrestler currently working for the Japanese promotion World Wonder Ring Stardom.

Professional wrestling career

World Wonder Ring Stardom (2017–present) 
Hina made her professional wrestling debut at the early age of 11 in World Wonder Ring Stardom, on the second night of the Stardom Shining Stars from June 11, 2017, where she teamed up with her twin sister Rina and fell short to Hanan in a 2-on-1 exhibition handicap match.

At  The Stardom Draft 2019 on April 14, Hina defeated Rina in a singles match and then she took part in the drafts where she was hand picked by Kagetsu to join the Queen's Quest unit.

At Stardom Yokohama Dream Cinderella 2021 on April 4, Hina defeated AZM and Lady C in a three-way match. On the first night of the Stardom Cinderella Tournament 2021 from April 10, she defeated Lady C in a singles match. On the second night from May 14, she teamed up with Momo Watanabe and AZM in a losing effort against Oedo Tai (Natsuko Tora, Konami and Fukigen Death). At Yokohama Dream Cinderella 2021 in Summer on July 4, Hina teamed up with Hanan and participated in a Gauntlet tag team match won by Konami and Fukigen Death and also involving Maika and Lady C, and Saki Kashima and Rina. Hina wrestled on the first night of the Stardom 5 Star Grand Prix 2021 from July 31 where she teamed up with AZM, Hanan and Lady C and competed in an Eight-woman tag team match where they fell short to Saki Kashima, Konami, Rina and Ruaka. Then she announced would take a break from professional wrestling to focus on her high school exams.

Hina made her return on the second night of the Stardom World Climax 2022 from March 27, where she challenged Hanan to a Future of Stardom Championship match. On the first night of the Stardom Cinderella Tournament 2022 from April 3, she fell short to Unagi Sayaka in the tournament's first round matches.

Personal life
Hina's real life twin sister Rina is also a professional wrestler. So is Hanan who is their older sister. They all compete in Stardom.

References

2006 births
Living people
Japanese female professional wrestlers
Japanese twins
People from Shimotsuke, Tochigi
Sportspeople from Tochigi Prefecture
Twin sportspeople
21st-century Japanese women